The Fountain City Classic is an annual American football game featuring Fort Valley State University and Albany State University, two of Georgia's historically black universities. The game is played at A. J. McClung Memorial Stadium in Columbus, Georgia.

History
Albany State and Fort Valley State first played in 1924, and the rivalry game officially became known as the Fountain City Classic in 1990. FVSU leads the series 45–39–4, following FVSU's 31–21 win in 2022.

The first postwar meeting of the two schools was in 1945, when FVSU beat ASU, 27–21. The two schools did not play each other in 1946 and 1947. While the rivalry between the two teams spans more than half a century, FCC officials moved the game to Columbus in 1990 to attract more corporate support.

Game results

See also  
 List of NCAA college football rivalry games
 List of black college football classics

References

External links
  Official site

Black college football classics
College football rivalries in the United States
Albany State Golden Rams football
Fort Valley State Wildcats football
1924 establishments in Georgia (U.S. state)
Recurring sporting events established in 1924